Oleksandr Petrovych Andriyevskyi (born 25 June 1994) is a Ukrainian professional footballer who plays as a midfielder for Dynamo Kyiv in the Ukrainian Premier League.

Career

Club
Andriyevskyi is a product of the FC Metalist Kharkiv youth school system. He made his debut for FC Metalist in the match against FC Vorskla Poltava on 10 May 2012 in the Ukrainian Premier League along with another débutante, Oleksandr Azatskyi.

In March 2015, Andriyevskyi joined FC Dynamo Kyiv.

While playing for FC Zorya Luhansk, he made his debut at continental competitions and in October 2017 he was selected as a player of the month in the Ukrainian Premier League.

In December 2020, the club Desna Chernihiv in the city of Chernihiv, showed interest in him.

International
Andriyevskyi made his Ukraine national team debut on 10 November 2017, when he came on as a substitute in a friendly 2–1 win over Slovakia at Arena Lviv.

Career statistics

Club

International

Honours
Dynamo Kyiv
Ukrainian Premier League: 2020–21
Ukrainian Cup: 2020–21

References

External links
 
 

1994 births
Living people
Footballers from Kyiv
Ukrainian footballers
FC Metalist Kharkiv players
Ukrainian Premier League players
Ukrainian First League players
FC Hirnyk-Sport Horishni Plavni players
FC Dynamo Kyiv players
FC Chornomorets Odesa players
FC Zorya Luhansk players
Ukraine youth international footballers
Ukraine international footballers
Association football midfielders
Ukraine under-21 international footballers